Catherine Matausch (born 5 March 1960) is a French journalist and painter. She began her career in journalism as an intern of the editorial staff at a local newspaper before joining the local news service of France 3. Matausch joined France 3's national news service in 1988, and reported on the news for such programmes as Soir 3, . She was also the co-presenter of the monthly spiritual show Agapè and the live music programme . As a painter, Matausch works with dry pastels, turpentine and watercolour under the pseudonym CathMath and has put her works on display in art galleries since 2006. She published the book Instants Nomades in 2015.

Biography
On 5 March 1960, Matausch was born in either Brignoles or Cabasse in Var, France. She is the oldest of four children to a mining father from Czechoslovakia called Eric Matausch and a mother by the name of Nadine Matausch ( Bonamy) who worked as a cermacist in a workshop. Matausch had some relatives who were painters, and she became interested in painting when she was in her teenage years, something her father disapproved of because he believed she would abuse drugs and not obtain employment. Matausch then thought of going into journalism due to her like of writing.

In mid-1982, Matausch began her career in journalism as an intern member of the editorial staff at the  newspaper. She went on to read the news on the Amiens programme at the France 3 Bourgogne television station and then read the local Picardy newspaper from November 1982. She was a junior worker at France 3 for the following seven years. Three years later, Matausch joined the national editorial staff of France 3, working as a society reporter for the Soir 3 programme. Starting in September 1992 (the start the 1992/93 television season), Matausch began reading the news on Soir 3 on weekdays after being given that job by France 3's management. She replaced  as the presenter of Soir 3 on weekends from September 1993. Matausch remained the programme's weekend news presenter until 1996.

Matausch was appointed the presenter of the  news bulletin in September 1996 and continued in the role until 2004. She and Bernard Pivot co-presented the live music programme  between 1995 and 1997. From 2004, she began reading the news on the weekend editions of 12/13 and 19/20. Matausch co-hosted with Hervé Claude the Agapè monthly spiritual adventure programme (similar to Le Jour du Seigneur) until 2009. In 2012, she joined the  arts programme Ce soir avec vous, presenting a cultural section on it. Matausch took some time off work due to an injury she sustained in a sports accident in early 2016 and was replaced by Nathanaël de Rincquesen until 19 February of that year. She took further time off work between March and May 2022 due to illness and was replaced by Christophe Gascard,  and Sophie Le Saint during that period. After Matausch rejected an offer to work at La Chaîne Info to focus on her family, she is due to stop reading the national news on France 3 when France Télévisions closes its France 3 national news service and replace it with 24 regional services in September 2023.

Since 2006, she has exhibited her art works at art galleries and has also promoted fellow artists. She works with dry pastels, turpentine and watercolour, and signs her paintings under the pseudonym CathMath. She first drew in her bedroom before moving to a studio and then her living room. She was the sponsor of the Noirmoutier Science Festival in late 2019 because of the opportunity to learn from neuroscience and how to care for the human body.

Personal life
Matausch is a divorcee and the mother of two children. She was diagnosed with lung cancer in early 2021 which was treated.

References

External links
 

1960 births
Living people
People from Var (department)
French people of Czech descent
20th-century French women 
21st-century French women
20th-century French painters
21st-century French painters
French women journalists
French women television presenters
French television journalists
French women painters
French watercolourists
Pastel artists